The Isis River is a minor perennial river located in the Somerset Land District, in the northern region of Tasmania, Australia.

Location and features
The river descends  over its  course.

See also

Rivers of Tasmania

References

Midlands (Tasmania)
Rivers of Tasmania